Jowlarestan (also Romanized as Jowlarestān; also known as Jolarestān) is a village in Abrisham Rural District, in the Central District of Falavarjan County, Isfahan Province, Iran. At the 2006 census, its population was 2,473, in 679 families.

References 

Populated places in Falavarjan County